Ratu Wilisoni Tuiketei Malani   (1920 – 14 June 2005) was the younger brother of Ratu Meli Salabogi, a Fijian chief Gonesau, medical doctor, and politician.

He was awarded the Order of the British Empire in 1981.

He was chairman of the Ra Provincial Council.

References

Fijian chiefs
1920 births
2005 deaths
I-Taukei Fijian members of the House of Representatives (Fiji)
Officers of the Order of the British Empire
People educated at Queen Victoria School (Fiji)
Fiji School of Medicine alumni
Fijian military doctors
Soqosoqo ni Vakavulewa ni Taukei politicians
Politicians from Nakorotubu